was a four-member Japanese band. They were signed onto Sony Music Japan's Epic Records Japan record label prior to their breakup in June 2012. The lyrics of each of the band's songs were written by lead vocalist and guitarist Yumi Uchimura.

Band history
The band was formed in October 2004 by Uchimura, while their first live performance took place in December of the same year. In 2007, their debut album, school food is good food, was released. In 2008, both of their songs, "feedback" and "Futari Umi no Soko" were featured as theme songs to the Japanese television drama  Joshidaisei Kaikeishi no Jikenbo, while their mini-album "Riff-rain" was released by Tower Records and sold out in under a week. They also performed in numerous live concerts, including FM802, part of the Minami Wheel 2008 live event, and the J-Wave Live event, part of the Tokyo Real Eyes Live Supernova.

In 2009, they signed onto their first major record label, Sony Music Japan's Epic Records Japan division. Their major label debut is "futuristic imagination", which is the ending theme to the Kenji Kamiyama anime television series Eden of the East, airing on the highly rated noitaminA timeslot on Fuji TV. Amongst their first projects was contributing to Judy and Mary's 15th Anniversary Tribute Album, in which they covered the band's "Brand New Wave Upper Ground" song, with their performance praised by sources such as The Japan Times as having been the highlight of the album and having evoked Judy and Mary's songwriting and musical values.

In 2012, the band announced that it would be going on an indefinite hiatus. The band said the decision came as a result of discussions between the four members.

On June 11, 2012, School Food Punishment announced that they had broken up due to vocalist Yumi Uchimura having left the band.

Following the dissolution of School Food Punishment, Yumi Uchimura, producer Ryo Eguchi and touring guitarist Ritsuo Mitsui joined the band la la larks known as successor of School Food Punishment. In 2016, Masayuki Hasuo and Hideaki Yamasaki had a new singer Annabel and formed the band siraph, too.

Final members 
 Yumi Uchimura (born on September 6, 1983, from Chiba)
 lead vocals, guitars, songwriter.
 Founder of the band.
 Favorite musicians： Ringo Shiina, Kuuki Koudan, Spangle call Lilli line
 Masayuki Hasuo (born on February 7, 1983, from Niigata)
 keyboards, organ, electric piano, composer.
 Favorite musicians： Melt-Banana, at.the.drive-in
 Hideaki Yamasaki (born on December 4, 1974, from Tottori Prefecture)
 bass guitar, backing vocals, composer.
 He joined the band in 2008, after scope (he left in 2002) and Watanabe (he left in 2004), etc.
 Favorite musicians： Ringo Shiina, Radwimps, Grapevine
 Osamu Hidai (born on November 24, 1981, from Kanagawa)
drums, composer.
 He joined the band in 2007. At first, he worked at two different bands, this band and Current of air (it Stopped the activity in 2008).
 Favorite musicians： Phish, Misako Odani, Nao Matsuzaki

 Past members
 Atsushi Ueda
 bass guitar. He left the band in 2008.
 Katsuya Katano
 drums. He left the band in 2007.

Discography
All lyrics written by Yumi Uchimura, all music composed by School Food Punishment.

CD singles
futuristic imagination (May 27, 2009) #35 with 1st week sales of 4,165　
Ending theme to the Fuji Television noitaminA anime television series, Eden of the East.
butterfly swimmer (July 22, 2009) #60 with 1st week sales of 1,657
sea-through communication  (October 7, 2009) #49 with 1st week sales of 1,368
light prayer (December 2, 2009) #31 with 1st week sales of 3,044
Main theme for the first Eden of the East film, The King of Eden.
future nova/after laughter (March 10, 2010)
"future nova" is the opening theme and "after laughter" is the ending theme to the second Eden of the East film, Paradise Lost.
RPG (May 11, 2011) #20 with 1st week sales of 4,323
Ending theme to the Fuji Television noitaminA anime television series, [C].
How to go (December 7, 2011) #18 with 1st week sales of 6,023
Opening theme to the Fuji Television noitaminA anime television series, Un-Go.

Album
amp-reflection (April 14, 2010)
Prog-Roid (July 13, 2011)

Indie singles
feedback/Futari Umi no Soko (released December 10, 2008)
"feedback": Opening theme to the BS-i television drama Joshidaisei Kaikeishi no Jikenbo, 3rd Annual Toho Shinemazu Gakusei Eigaisai image song.
"Futari Umi no Soko": Ending theme to the BS-i television drama Joshidaisei Kaikeishi no Jikenbo.

EP
school food is good food (released April 4, 2007)
CD-extra: Music video to "pool".
pool: Ending theme to the Kansai TV television series Bari-san ver. 2.0.
air feel, color swim (released November 21, 2007)
CD-extra: Music video to "you may crawl"
Riff-rain (released on December 10, 2008, by Tower Records, general release on January 14, 2009)

Collaborations
nextpop (released October 6, 2006)
Featured "pool".
Judy and Mary 15th Anniversary Tribute Album (released March 18, 2009)
Performed cover of "Brand New Wave Upper Ground".

Demo albums
1st Demo (released May 2005)
2nd Demo (released May 2006)

References

External links

Official website 
Boundie's website for School Food Punishment 
school food punishment at MySpace

Japanese post-rock groups
Sony Music Entertainment Japan artists
Japanese rock music groups
Japanese electronic music groups
Musical groups from Tokyo
Musical groups established in 2004
2004 establishments in Japan